Vakhtang or Tsuata (c. 1118 – 1138) was the Georgian Bagrationi prince and the son of King David IV "the Builder" (r. 1089–1125), probably of his second marriage to the Cuman-Kipchak "princess" Gurandukht, daughter of Otrok.

The 12th-century document The Will of King David contains a vague and controversial passage whereby David instructs the eldest son and heir apparent Demetrius I to rear his younger brother Vakhtang and make him a successor to the throne if the latter proves to be "capable". Given the Georgian order of succession based on primogeniture and indication that an attempted coup against Demetrius in the 1130s involved Vakhtang, many modern scholars in Georgia consider the passage to be a latter-day forgery by Vakhtang's sympathizers. A reference to the aristocratic plot against Demetrius on behalf of Vakhtang is found in the contemporaneous Armenian chronicle by Vardan although the author does not directly names the rebellious prince. This plot, intended to assassinate Demetrius I, was directed by the influential nobleman Ivane Abuletisdze and his son Kirkish. The king was timely warned by Ivane's father Abulet. Vakhtang was captured, blinded and cast in prison where he apparently died shortly afterwards.

Ancestry

References 

1110s births
1138 deaths
Bagrationi dynasty of the Kingdom of Georgia
Georgian princes
People of Cuman descent